Hypericum collenetteae is a species of flowering plant of the St. John's wort family (Hypericaceae) that is found in Saudi Arabia.

Taxonomy 
Hypericum collenetteae was first described by Norman Robson in 1993. Robson spelt the specific epithet collenettiae. This is corrected to collenetteae in the International Plant Names Index entry. According to the International Code of Nomenclature for algae, fungi, and plants, Article 60.8, a connecting i is not used in epithets formed from personal names ending with a vowel. Iris Sheila Collenette is noted for her work on the botany of Saudi Arabia, and collected the holotype of this species.

The placement of H. collenetteae within Hypericum can be summarized as follows:

Hypericum
 Hypericum subg. Hypericum
 Hypericum sect. Adenosepalum
 subsect. Adenosepalum
 subsect. Aethiopica
 Huber-Morathii group
 subsect. Caprifolia
 H. caprifolium
 H. coadunatum
 H. collenetteae
 H. naudinianum
 H. psilophytum
 H. pubescens
 H. scruglii
 H. sinaicum
 H. somaliense
 H. tomentosum

References 

collenetteae